Brooke Boden (born c. 1973) is an American politician. She has served as a member of the Iowa House of Representatives from District 21 since 2021 and as a Republican.

Business career
Prior to pursuing political office, Boden had operated a dance studio for 24 years. While working for National Ballooning Ltd., a hot air balloon manufacturer owned by her family, Boden attained a repairman certificate, permitting her to inspect and repair hot air balloons. She also holds a license as an insurance agent, and worked as a dental assistant.

Political career
Boden lobbied for legislation supporting Iowa residents with Lyme disease, which passed the Iowa General Assembly in 2017. She later became a co-chair of the Warren County Republican Party.

In 2019, Boden began campaigning for the Iowa House seat held by Scott Ourth. She defeated Ourth in November 2020, winning 9,756 votes to Ourth's 8,411 votes. Boden took office on 11 January 2021, and was named vice chair of the state government committee.

References

1970s births
Living people
21st-century American women politicians
21st-century American politicians
People from Indianola, Iowa
Women state legislators in Iowa
Republican Party members of the Iowa House of Representatives